This is a listing of the major works of Louis Botinelly, a French sculptor born in Digne on 2 January 1883 and died in Marseille on 26 March 1962. His father was a mason, originally from Tessin in Switzerland, who had a workshop in Digne before the family moved to Marseille when his father inherited a workshop there from his brother. Thanks to a bursary from the city of Marseille, Botinelly was able to stay in Italy for a period in 1902 and then study in Paris under Jules Coutan. He moved to Paris in 1906. In 1914 he was conscripted and joined the 7th Regiment of Engineers in Avignon. The huge demand for war memorials after 1918 meant that in the early 1920s he received many commissions for war memorial sculptures as evidenced in the listing below.  In some records the sculptor's name is recorded as "Botinelli".

Public monuments and memorials

Works in cathedrals and churches

War memorials

Further reading
"Louis Botinelly, sculpteur provençal : Catalogue raisonné" by Laurent Noet. Published in 2006 in Paris by Mare & Martin.

References

Sculptures in France
Botinelly, Louis